Peter Alfred Jones (born 25 November 1949) is an English former professional footballer who played as a full back. He played in the Football League for Burnley and Swansea City. He also represented England at youth level.

References

1949 births
Living people
People from Ellesmere Port
English footballers
Association football defenders
Burnley F.C. players
Swansea City A.F.C. players
English Football League players
Sportspeople from Cheshire